The Whatnauts were an American soul group from Baltimore, Maryland, founded in 1969. George Kerr produced them. The group had several hit singles in the early 1970s, including the socially conscious single "Message from a Black Man" in 1970 on A&I International, "Please Make the Love Go Away" also in 1970 but on Stang, and their biggest success "I'll Erase Away Your Pain" in 1971. They performed with fellow Stang artists The Moments for the hit single "Girls" in 1974.

Members
 Billy Herndon
 Garrett Jones
 Gerard "Chunky" Pinkney

Discography

Albums

Singles

References

External links
 

American soul musical groups
All Platinum artists
Musical groups from Baltimore